

Bracket

First round games at campus sites of higher seeds
Second round, semifinals, and final at Nutter Center, Fairborn, OH

References

Tournament
Horizon League men's basketball tournament
Horizon League men's basketball tournament
Horizon League men's basketball tournament
Horizon League men's basketball tournament
College basketball tournaments in Ohio
Fairborn, Ohio